Triceratops is a genus of herbivorous chasmosaurine ceratopsid dinosaur that first appeared during the late Maastrichtian stage of the Late Cretaceous period, about 68 million years ago in what is now North America. It is one of the last-known non-avian dinosaur genera, and became extinct in the Cretaceous–Paleogene extinction event 66 million years ago. The name Triceratops, which literally means 'three-horned face', is derived from the Greek words  meaning 'three',  meaning 'horn', and  meaning 'face'.

Bearing a large bony frill, three horns on the skull, and a large four-legged body, exhibiting convergent evolution with bovines and rhinoceroses, Triceratops is one of the most recognizable of all dinosaurs and the most well-known ceratopsid. It shared the landscape with and was most likely preyed upon by Tyrannosaurus, though it is less certain that two adults did battle in the fanciful manner often depicted in museum displays and popular images. The functions of the frills and three distinctive facial horns on its head have long inspired debate. Traditionally, these have been viewed as defensive weapons against predators. More recent interpretations find it probable that these features were primarily used in species identification, courtship, and dominance display, much like the antlers and horns of modern ungulates.

Triceratops was traditionally placed within the "short-frilled" ceratopsids, but modern cladistic studies show it to be a member of the Chasmosaurinae which usually have long frills. Two species, T. horridus and T. prorsus, are considered valid today, from the seventeen species that have ever been named. Research published in 2010 concluded that the contemporaneous Torosaurus, a ceratopsid long regarded as a separate genus, represents Triceratops in its mature form. This view has been disputed; further data is needed to settle the debate.

Triceratops has been documented by numerous remains collected since the genus was first described in 1889 by American paleontologist Othniel Charles Marsh. Specimens representing life stages from hatchling to adult have been found. As the archetypal ceratopsid, Triceratops is one of the most popular dinosaurs, and has been featured in film, postal stamps, and many other types of media.

Discovery and identification

The first named fossil specimen now attributed to Triceratops is a pair of brow horns attached to a skull roof, found by George Lyman Cannon near Denver, Colorado, in the spring of 1887. This specimen was sent to Marsh, who believed that the formation from which it came dated from the Pliocene, and that the bones belonged to a particularly large and unusual bison, which he named Bison alticornis. He realized that there were horned dinosaurs by the next year, which saw his publication of the genus Ceratops from fragmentary remains, but he still believed B. alticornis to be a Pliocene mammal. It took a third and much more complete skull to change his mind. 

Although not confidentially assignable, fossils possibly belonging to Triceratops were described as two taxa, Agathaumas sylvestris and Polyonax mortuarius in 1872 and 1874 respectively, by Marsh’s rival Edward Drinker Cope. Agathaumas was named based on a pelvis, several vertebrae, and some ribs collected by Fielding Bradford Meek and Henry Martyn Bannister near the Green River of southeastern Wyoming from layers coming from the Maastrichtian Lance Formation. Due to the fragmentary nature of the remains, it can only confidently be assigned to Ceratopsidae. Polyonax mortuarius was collected by Cope himself in 1873 from northeastern Colorado, possibly coming from the Maastrichtian Denver Formation. The fossils only consisted of fragmentary horn cores, 3 dorsal vertebrae, and fragmentary limb elements. Polyonax has the same issue as Agathaumas, with the fragmentary remains non-assignable beyond Ceratopsidae.

The Triceratops holotype (YPM 1820) was collected in 1888 from the Lance Formation of Wyoming, USA, by fossil hunter John Bell Hatcher, yet Marsh initially described this specimen as another species of Ceratops. Cowboy Edmund B. Wilson had been startled by the sight of a monstrous skull poking out of the side of a ravine. He tried to recover it by throwing a lasso around one of the horns. When it broke off, the skull tumbling to the bottom of the cleft, Wilson brought the horn to his boss, the rancher and avid fossil collector Charles Arthur Guernsey, who happened to show it to Hatcher. Marsh subsequently ordered Hatcher to locate and salvage the skull. The holotype was first named Ceratops horridus. When further preparation uncovered the third nose horn, Marsh changed his mind and gave the piece the generic name Triceratops, accepting his Bison alticornis as another species of Ceratops. (It would later be added to Triceratops.) The sturdy nature of the animal's skull has ensured that many examples have been preserved as fossils, allowing variations between species and individuals to be studied. Triceratops remains have subsequently been found in the American states of Montana and South Dakota (and more in Colorado and Wyoming), as well as the Canadian provinces of Saskatchewan and Alberta.

Species

After Triceratops was described, between 1889 and 1891 Hatcher with great effort collected another thirty-one of its skulls. The first species had been named T. horridus by Marsh. Its specific name was derived from the Latin  ('rough, rugose'), perhaps referring to the type specimen's rough texture, later identified as an aged individual. The additional skulls varied to a lesser or greater degree from the original holotype. This variation is unsurprising, given that Triceratops skulls are large three-dimensional objects, coming from individuals of different ages and both sexes, and which were subjected to different amounts and directions of pressure during fossilization.

In the first attempt to understand the many species, Richard Swann Lull found two groups, although he did not say how he distinguished them: One composed of T. horridus, T. prorsus, and T. brevicornus ('the short-horned'); the other of T. elatus and T. calicornis. Two species (T. serratus and T. flabellatus) stood apart from these groups. By 1933 and his revision of the landmark 1907 Hatcher–Marsh–Lull monograph of all known ceratopsians, he retained his two groups and two unaffiliated species, with a third lineage of T. obtusus and T. hatcheri ('Hatcher's') that was characterized by a very small nasal horn. T. horridus–T. prorsus–T. brevicornus was now thought to be the most conservative lineage, with an increase in skull size and a decrease in nasal horn size, and T. elatus–T. calicornis was defined by large brow horns and small nasal horn. C. M. Sternberg made one modification, adding T. eurycephalus ('the wide-headed') and suggesting that it linked the second and third lineages closer together than they were to the T. horridus lineage.

With time, the idea that the differing skulls might be representative of individual variation within one (or two) species gained popularity. In 1986, John Ostrom and Peter Wellnhofer published a paper in which they proposed that there was only one species, Triceratops horridus. Part of their rationale was that generally there are only one or two species of any large animal in a region. To their findings, Thomas Lehman added the old Lull–Sternberg lineages combined with maturity and sexual dimorphism, suggesting that the T. horridus–T. prorsus–T. brevicornus lineage was composed of females, the T. calicornis–T. elatus lineage was made up of males, and the T. obtusus–T. hatcheri lineage was of pathologic old males.

These findings were contested a few years later by Catherine Forster, who reanalyzed Triceratops material more comprehensively and concluded that the remains fell into two species, T. horridus and T. prorsus, although the distinctive skull of T. ("Nedoceratops") hatcheri differed enough to warrant a separate genus. She found that T. horridus and several other species belonged together, and T. prorsus and T. brevicornus stood alone. Since there were many more specimens in the first group, she suggested that this meant the two groups were two species. It is still possible to interpret the differences as representing a single species with sexual dimorphism.

In 2009, John Scannella and Denver Fowler supported the separation of T. prorsus and T. horridus and noted that the two species are also separated stratigraphically within the Hell Creek Formation, indicating that they did not live together at the same time.

Valid species

 T. horridus (Marsh, 1889) Marsh, 1889 (originally Ceratops) (type species)
 T. prorsus Marsh, 1890

Synonyms and doubtful species
Some of the following species are synonyms, as indicated in parentheses ("=T. horridus" or "=T. prorsus"). All the others are each considered a  because they are based on remains too poor or incomplete to be distinguished from pre-existing Triceratops species.

 T. albertensis C. M. Sternberg, 1949
 T. alticornis (Marsh 1887) Hatcher, Marsh, and Lull, 1907 [originally Bison alticornis, Marsh 1887, and Ceratops alticornis, Marsh 1888]
 T. brevicornus Hatcher, 1905 (=T. prorsus)
 T. calicornis Marsh, 1898 (=T. horridus)
 T. elatus Marsh, 1891 (=T. horridus)
 T. eurycephalus Schlaikjer, 1935
 T. flabellatus Marsh, 1889 (= Sterrholophus Marsh, 1891) (=T. horridus)
 T. galeus Marsh, 1889
 T. hatcheri (Hatcher & Lull 1905) Lull, 1933 (contentious; see Nedoceratops below)
 T. ingens Marsh vide Lull, 1915
 T. maximus Brown, 1933
 T. mortuarius (Cope, 1874) Kuhn, 1936 (nomen dubium; originally Polyonax mortuarius)
 T. obtusus Marsh, 1898 (=T. horridus)
 T. serratus Marsh, 1890 (=T. horridus)
 T. sulcatus Marsh, 1890
 T. sylvestris (Cope, 1872) Kuhn, 1936 (nomen dubium; originally Agathaumas sylvestris)

Description

Size

Skull

Like all chasmosaurines, Triceratops had a large skull relative to its body size, among the largest of all land animals. The largest-known skull (specimen MWC 7584, formerly BYU 12183) is estimated to have been  in length when complete, and could reach almost a third of the length of the entire animal.

The front of the head was equipped with a large beak in front of the teeth. The core of the top beak was formed by a special rostral bone. Behind it, the premaxillae bones were located, embayed from behind by very large circular nostrils. In chasmosaurines, the premaxillae met on their midline in a complex bone plate, the rear edge of which was reinforced by the "narial strut". From the base of this strut, a triangular process jutted out into the nostril. Triceratops differs from most relatives in that this process was hollowed out on the outer side. Behind the toothless premaxilla, the maxilla bore thirty-six to forty tooth positions, in which three to five teeth per position were vertically stacked. The teeth were closely appressed, forming a "dental battery" curving to the inside. The skull bore a single horn on the snout, above the nostrils. In Triceratops, the nose horn is sometimes recognisable as a separate ossification, the epinasal. 

The jugal bones pointed to below at the rear sides of the skull and were capped by separate epijugals. With Triceratops these were not particularly large and sometimes touched the quadratojugals. The bones of the skull roof were fused. By a folding of the frontal bones, a "double" skull roof was created. In Triceratops, some specimens show a fontanelle, an opening in the upper roof layer. The cavity between the layers invaded the bone cores of the brow horns.

At the rear of the skull, the outer squamosal bones and the inner parietal bones grew into a relatively short, bony frill, adorned with epoccipitals in young specimens. These were low triangular processes on the frill edge, representing separate skin ossifications or osteoderms. Typically, with Triceratops specimens there are two epoccipitals present on each parietal bone, with an additional central process on their border. Each squamosal bone had five processes. Most other ceratopsids had large parietal fenestrae, openings, in their frills, but those of Triceratops were noticeably solid, unless the genus Torosaurus represents mature Triceratops individuals.

The lower jaws were elongated and met at their tips in a shared epidentary bone, the core of the toothless lower beak. In the dentary bone, the tooth battery curved to the outside to meet the battery of the upper jaw. At the rear of the lower jaw, the articular bone was exceptionally wide, matching the general width of the jaw joint. T. horridus can be distinguished from T. prorsus by having a shallower snout.

Postcranial skeleton

Chasmosaurines showed little variation in their postcranial skeleton. The skeleton of Triceratops is markedly robust. Both Triceratops species possessed a sturdy build, with strong limbs, short hands with three hooves each, and short feet with four hooves each. The vertebral column consisted of ten neck, twelve back, ten sacral and about forty-five tail vertebrae. The front neck vertebrae were fused into a syncervical. Traditionally, this was assumed to have incorporated the first three vertebrae which would imply that the frontmost atlas was very large and sported a neural spine. Later interpretations revived an old hypothesis by John Bell Hatcher that at the very front a vestige of the real atlas can be observed, the syncervical then consisting of four vertebrae. The vertebral count mentioned, is adjusted to this view. In Triceratops the neural spines of the neck are constant in height, instead of gradually sloping upwards. Another peculiarity is that the neck ribs only begin to lengthen with the ninth cervical vertebra.

The rather short and high vertebrae of the back were in its middle region reinforced by ossified tendons running along the tops of the neural arches. The straight sacrum was long and adult individuals show a fusion of all sacral vertebrae. In Triceratops the first four and last two sacrals had transverse processes, connecting the vertebral column to the pelvis, that were fused at their distal ends. Sacrals seven and eight had longer processes, causing the sacrum to have an oval profile in top view. On top of the sacrum a neural plate was present formed by a fusion of the neural spines of the second through fifth vertebrae. Triceratops had a large pelvis with a long ilium. The ischium was curved downwards. The foot was short with four functional toes. The phalangeal formula of the foot is 2-3-4-5-0.

Although certainly quadrupedal, the posture of horned dinosaurs has long been the subject of some debate. Originally, it was believed that the front legs of the animal had to be sprawling at a considerable angle from the thorax in order to better bear the weight of the head. This stance can be seen in paintings by Charles Knight and Rudolph Zallinger. Ichnological evidence in the form of trackways from horned dinosaurs and recent reconstructions of skeletons (both physical and digital) seem to show that Triceratops and other ceratopsids maintained an upright stance during normal locomotion, with the elbows flexed to behind and slightly bowed out, in an intermediate state between fully upright and fully sprawling, comparable to the modern rhinoceros.

The hands and forearms of Triceratops retained a fairly primitive structure compared to other quadrupedal dinosaurs such as thyreophorans and many sauropods. In those two groups, the forelimbs of quadrupedal species were usually rotated so that the hands faced forward with palms backward ("pronated") as the animals walked. Triceratops, like other ceratopsians and the related quadrupedal ornithopods, together forming the Cerapoda, walked with most of their fingers pointing out and away from the body, the original condition for dinosaurs, also retained by bipedal forms like the theropods. In Triceratops, the weight of the body was carried by only the first three fingers of the hand, while digits 4 and 5 were vestigial and lacked claws or hooves. The phalangeal formula of the hand is 2-3-4-3-1, meaning that the first or innermost finger of the forelimb has two bones, the next has three, etc.

Skin 
Preserved skin from the body of Triceratops is known. A preserved piece of skin from the frill of a specimen is also known, which consists of small polygonal basement scales.

Classification

Triceratops is the best-known genus of the Ceratopsidae, a family of large, mostly North American horned dinosaurs. The exact relationship of Triceratops among the ceratopsids has been debated over the years. Confusion stemmed mainly from the combination of a short, solid frill (similar to that of Centrosaurinae), with long brow horns (more akin to Chasmosaurinae). In the first overview of horned dinosaurs, R. S. Lull hypothesized the existence of two lineages, one of Monoclonius and Centrosaurus leading to Triceratops, the other with Ceratops and Torosaurus, making Triceratops a centrosaurine as the group is understood today. Later revisions supported this view, Lawrence Lambe in 1915 formally describing the first, short-frilled group as the Centrosaurinae (including Triceratops), and the second, long-frilled group as the Chasmosaurinae.

In 1949, Charles M. Sternberg was the first to question this position, proposing instead that Triceratops was more closely related to Arrhinoceratops and Chasmosaurus based on skull and horn features, making Triceratops a chasmosaurine ("ceratopsine" in his usage) genus. He was largely ignored, with John Ostrom and later David Norman placing Triceratops within the Centrosaurinae.

Subsequent discoveries and analyses, however, proved the correctness of Sternberg's view on the position of Triceratops, with Thomas Lehman defining both subfamilies in 1990 and diagnosing Triceratops as "ceratopsine" on the basis of several morphological features. Apart from the one feature of a shortened frill, Triceratops shares no derived traits with centrosaurines. Further research by Peter Dodson, including a 1990 cladistic analysis and a 1993 study using RFTRA (resistant-fit theta-rho analysis), a morphometric technique which systematically measures similarities in skull shape, reinforces Triceratops placement in the chasmosaurines.

The cladogram below follows Longrich (2014), who named a new species of Pentaceratops, and included nearly all species of chasmosaurine.

For many years after its discovery, the deeper evolutionary origins of Triceratops and its close relatives remained largely obscure. In 1922, the newly discovered Protoceratops was seen as its ancestor by Henry Fairfield Osborn, but many decades passed before additional findings came to light. Recent years have been fruitful for the discovery of several antecedents of Triceratops. Zuniceratops, the earliest-known ceratopsian with brow horns, was described in the late 1990s, and Yinlong, the first known Jurassic ceratopsian, in 2005.

These new finds have been vital in illustrating the origins of horned dinosaurs in general, suggesting an Asian origin in the Jurassic, and the appearance of truly horned ceratopsians by the beginning of the Late Cretaceous in North America.

In phylogenetic taxonomy, the genus Triceratops has been used as a reference point in the definition of Dinosauria; dinosaurs have been designated as all descendants of the most recent common ancestor of Triceratops and modern birds. Furthermore, the bird-hipped dinosaurs have been defined as those dinosaurs more closely related to Triceratops than to modern birds.

Paleobiology

Although Triceratops are commonly portrayed as herding animals, there is currently little evidence that they lived in herds. While several other genera of horned dinosaurs are known from bone beds preserving bones from two to hundreds or thousands of individuals, to date there is only one documented bonebed dominated by Triceratops bones: a site in southeastern Montana with the remains of three juveniles. It may be significant that only juveniles were present. In 2012, a group of three Triceratops in relatively complete condition, each of varying sizes from a full-grown adult to a small juvenile, were found near Newcastle, Wyoming. The remains are currently under excavation by paleontologist Peter Larson and a team from the Black Hills Institute. It is believed that the animals were traveling as a family unit, but it remains unknown if the group consists of a mated pair and their offspring, or two females and a juvenile they were caring for. The remains also show signs of predation or scavenging from Tyrannosaurus, particularly on the largest specimen, with the bones of the front limbs showing breakage and puncture wounds from Tyrannosaurus teeth. In 2020 Illies and Fowler described the co-ossified distal caudal vertebrae of Triceratops. According to them, this pathology could have arisen after one Triceratops accidentally stepped on the tail of another member of the herd.

For many years, Triceratops finds were known only from solitary individuals. These remains are very common; for example, Bruce Erickson, a paleontologist of the Science Museum of Minnesota, has reported having seen 200 specimens of T. prorsus in the Hell Creek Formation of Montana. Similarly, Barnum Brown claimed to have seen over 500 skulls in the field. Because Triceratops teeth, horn fragments, frill fragments, and other skull fragments are such abundant fossils in the Lancian faunal stage of the late Maastrichtian (Late Cretaceous, 66 mya) Period of western North America, it is regarded as among the dominant herbivores of the time, if not the most dominant herbivore. In 1986, Robert Bakker estimated it as making up five sixths of the large dinosaur fauna at the end of the Cretaceous. Unlike most animals, skull fossils are far more common than postcranial bones for Triceratops, suggesting that the skull had an unusually high preservation potential.

Analysis of the endocranial anatomy of Triceratops suggest its sense of smell was poor compared to that of other dinosaurs. Its ears were attuned to low frequency sounds given the short cochlear lengths recorded in an analysis by Sakagami et al,. This same study also suggests that Triceratops held its head about 45 degrees to the ground; an angle which would showcase the horns and frill most effectively while simultaneously allowing the animal to take advantage of food through grazing.  
 
A 2022 study by Wiemann and colleagues of various dinosaur genera including Triceratops suggests that it had an ectothermic (cold blooded) or gigantothermic metabolism, on par with that of modern reptiles. This was uncovered using the spectroscopy of lipoxidation signals, which are byproducts of oxidative phosphorylation and correlate with metabolic rates. They suggested that such metabolisms may have been common for ornithischian dinosaurs in general, with the group evolving towards ectothermy from an ancestor with an endothermic (warm blooded) metabolism.

Dentition and diet

Triceratops were herbivorous, and because of their low slung head, their primary food was probably low growing vegetation, although they may have been able to knock down taller plants with their horns, beak, and bulk. The jaws were tipped with a deep, narrow beak, believed to have been better at grasping and plucking than biting.

Triceratops teeth were arranged in groups called batteries, of 36 to 40 tooth columns in each side of each jaw, with 3 to 5 stacked teeth per column, depending on the size of the animal. This gives a range of 432 to 800 teeth, of which only a fraction were in use at any given time (Tooth replacement was continuous throughout the life of the animal). They functioned by shearing in a vertical to near-vertical orientation. The great size and numerous teeth of Triceratops suggests that they ate large volumes of fibrous plant material, with some researchers suggesting palms and cycads, and others suggesting ferns, which then grew in prairies.

Functions of the horns and frill

There has been much speculation over the functions of Triceratops head adornments. The two main theories have revolved around use in combat and in courtship display, with the latter now thought to be the most likely primary function.

Early on, Lull postulated that the frills may have served as anchor points for the jaw muscles to aid chewing by allowing increased size and thus power for the muscles. This has been put forward by other authors over the years, but later studies do not find evidence of large muscle attachments on the frill bones.

Triceratops were long thought to have used their horns and frills in combat with predators such as Tyrannosaurus, the idea being discussed first by Charles H. Sternberg in 1917 and 70 years later by Robert Bakker. There is evidence that Tyrannosaurus did have aggressive head-on encounters with Triceratops, based on partially healed tyrannosaur tooth marks on a Triceratops brow horn and squamosal; the bitten horn is also broken, with new bone growth after the break. Which animal was the aggressor is not known.  Paleontologist Peter Dodson estimates that in a battle against a bull Triceratops, the Triceratops had the upper hand and would successfully defend itself by inflicting fatal wounds to the Tyrannosaurus using its sharp horns. Tyrannosaurus is also known to have fed on Triceratops, as shown by a heavily tooth-scored Triceratops ilium and sacrum. 

In addition to combat with predators using horns, Triceratops are popularly shown engaging each other in combat with horns locked. While studies show that such activity would be feasible, if unlike that of present-day horned animals, there is disagreement about whether they did so. Although pitting, holes, lesions, and other damage on Triceratops skulls (and the skulls of other ceratopsids) are often attributed to horn damage in combat, a 2006 study finds no evidence for horn thrust injuries causing these forms of damage (for example, there is no evidence of infection or healing). Instead, non-pathological bone resorption, or unknown bone diseases, are suggested as causes. A newer study compared incidence rates of skull lesions and periosteal reaction in Triceratops and Centrosaurus and showed that these were consistent with Triceratops using its horns in combat and the frill being adapted as a protective structure, while lower pathology rates in Centrosaurus may indicate visual rather than physical use of cranial ornamentation, or a form of combat focused on the body rather than the head. The frequency of injury was found to be 14% in Triceratops. The researchers also concluded that the damage found on the specimens in the study was often too localized to be caused by bone disease. Histological examination reveals that the frill of Triceratops is composed of fibrolamellar bone which contains fibroblasts that play a critical role in wound healing, and are capable of rapidly depositing bone during remodeling.

One skull was found with a hole in the jugal bone, apparently a puncture wound sustained while the animal was alive, as indicated by signs of healing. The hole has a diameter close to that of the distal end of a Triceratops horn. This, and other apparent healed wounds in the skulls of ceratopsians, has been cited as evidence of non-fatal intraspecific competition in these dinosaurs. Another specimen, referred to as "Big John" has a similar fenestra to the squamosal caused by what appears to be another Triceratops horn, and the squamosal bone shows signs of significant healing, further vindicating the hypothesis that this ceratopsian used its horns for intra-specific combat.

The large frill also may have helped to increase body area to regulate body temperature. A similar theory has been proposed regarding the plates of Stegosaurus, although this use alone would not account for the bizarre and extravagant variation seen in different members of the Ceratopsidae, which would rather support the sexual display theory.

The theory that frills functioned as a sexual display was first proposed by Davitashvili in 1961 and has gained increasing acceptance since. Evidence that visual display was important, either in courtship or other social behavior, can be seen in the horned dinosaurs differing markedly in their adornments, making each species highly distinctive. Also, modern living creatures with such displays of horns and adornments use them similarly. A 2006 study of the smallest Triceratops skull, ascertained to be a juvenile, shows the frill and horns developed at a very early age, predating sexual development and thus probably important for visual communication and species recognition in general. The use of the exaggerated structures to enable dinosaurs to recognize their own species has been questioned, as no such function exists for such structures in modern species.

Growth and ontogeny

In 2006, the first extensive ontogenetic study of Triceratops was published in the journal Proceedings of the Royal Society. The study, by John R. Horner and Mark Goodwin, found that individuals of Triceratops could be divided into four general ontogenetic groups: babies, juveniles, subadults, and adults. Ten of the 28 skulls could be placed in order in a growth series with one representing each age. Each of the four growth stages were found to have identifying features. Multiple ontogenetic trends were discovered, including the size reduction of the epoccipitals, development and reorientation of postorbital horns, and hollowing out of the horns.

Torosaurus as growth stage of Triceratops

Torosaurus is a ceratopsid genus first identified from a pair of skulls in 1891, two years after the identification of Triceratops by Charles Marsh. The genus Torosaurus resembles Triceratops in geological age, distribution, anatomy and size and it has been recognised as a close relative. Its distinguishing features are an elongated skull and the presence of two fenestrae, or holes, in the frill. Paleontologists investigating dinosaur ontogeny (growth and development of individuals over the life span) in Montana's Hell Creek Formation have recently presented evidence that the two represent a single genus.

John Scannella, in a paper presented in Bristol at the conference of the Society of Vertebrate Paleontology (September 25, 2009), reclassified Torosaurus as especially mature Triceratops individuals, perhaps representing a single sex. Horner, Scannella's mentor at Bozeman Campus, Montana State University, noted that ceratopsian skulls consist of metaplastic bone. A characteristic of metaplastic bone is that it lengthens and shortens over time, extending and resorbing to form new shapes. Significant variety is seen even in those skulls already identified as Triceratops, Horner said, "where the horn orientation is backwards in juveniles and forward in adults". Approximately 50% of all subadult Triceratops skulls have two thin areas in the frill that correspond with the placement of "holes" in Torosaurus skulls, suggesting that holes developed to offset the weight that would otherwise have been added as maturing Triceratops individuals grew longer frills. A paper describing these findings in detail was published in July 2010 by Scannella and Horner. It formally argues that Torosaurus and the similar contemporary Nedoceratops are synonymous with Triceratops.

The assertion ignited debate. Andrew Farke had in 2006 stressed that, apart from the frill, no systematic differences could be found between Torosaurus and Triceratops. He nevertheless disputed Scannella's conclusion by arguing in 2011 that the proposed morphological changes required to "age" a Triceratops into a Torosaurus would be without precedent among ceratopsids. Such changes would include the growth of additional epoccipitals, reversion of bone texture from an adult to immature type and back to adult again, and growth of frill holes at a later stage than usual. A study by Nicholas Longrich and Daniel Field analyzed 35 specimens of both Triceratops and Torosaurus. The authors concluded that Triceratops individuals too old to be considered immature forms are represented in the fossil record, as are Torosaurus individuals too young to be considered fully mature adults. The synonymy of Triceratops and Torosaurus cannot be supported, they said, without more convincing intermediate forms than Scannella and Horner initially produced. Scannella's Triceratops specimen with a hole on its frill, they argued, could represent a diseased or malformed individual rather than a transitional stage between an immature Triceratops and mature Torosaurus form.

Other genera as growth stages of Triceratops

Opinion has varied on the validity of a separate genus for Nedoceratops. Scannella and Horner regarded it as an intermediate growth stage between Triceratops and Torosaurus. Farke, in his 2011 redescription of the only known skull, concluded that it was an aged individual of its own valid taxon, Nedoceratops hatcheri. Longrich and Fields also did not consider it a transition between Torosaurus and Triceratops, suggesting that the frill holes were pathological.

As described above, Scannella had argued in 2010 that Nedoceratops should be considered a synonym of Triceratops. Farke (2011) maintained that it represents a valid distinct genus. Longrich agreed with Scannella about Nedoceratops and made a further suggestion: that the recently described Ojoceratops was likewise a synonym. The fossils, he argued, are indistinguishable from the Triceratops horridus specimens that were previously attributed to the defunct species Triceratops serratus.

Longrich observed that another newly described genus, Tatankaceratops, displayed a strange mix of characteristics already found in adult and juvenile Triceratops. Rather than representing a distinct genus, Tatankaceratops could as easily represent a dwarf Triceratops or a Triceratops individual with a developmental disorder that caused it to stop growing prematurely.

Paleoecology

Triceratops lived during the Late Cretaceous of North America, its fossils coming from the Evanston Formation, Scollard Formation, Laramie Formation, Lance Formation, Denver Formation, and Hell Creek Formation. These fossil formations date back to the time of the Cretaceous–Paleogene extinction event, which has been dated to 66 ± 0.07 million years ago. Many animals and plants have been found in these formations, but mostly from the Lance Formation and Hell Creek Formation. Triceratops was one of the last ceratopsian genera to appear before the end of the Mesozoic. The related Torosaurus, and the more distantly related diminutive Leptoceratops, were also present, though their remains have been rarely encountered.

Theropods from these formations include genera of dromaeosaurids, tyrannosaurids, ornithomimids, troodontids, avialans, and caenagnathids,
Dromaeosaurids from the Hell Creek Formation are Acheroraptor and Dakotaraptor. Indeterminate dromaeosaurs are known from other fossil formations. Common teeth previously referred to Dromaeosaurus and Saurornitholestes later were considered to be Acheroraptor.
The tyrannosaurids from the formation are Nanotyrannus and Tyrannosaurus, although the former might be a junior synonym of the latter.
Among ornithomimids are the genera Struthiomimus as well as Ornithomimus; an undescribed animal named "Orcomimus" could be from the formation.
Troodontids are only represented by Pectinodon and Paronychodon in the Hell Creek Formation; with a possible species of Troodon from the Lance Formation.
One species of coelurosaur is known from Hell Creek and similar formations by a single species, Richardoestesia.
Only three oviraptorosaurs are from the Hell Creek Formation: Anzu, Leptorhynchos and a giant species of caenagnathid, very similar to Gigantoraptor, from South Dakota. However, only fossilized foot prints were discovered.
The avialans known from the formation are Avisaurus, multiple species of Brodavis, and several other species of hesperornithoforms, as well as several species of true birds, including Cimolopteryx.

Ornithischians are abundant in the Scollard, Laramie, Lance, Denver, and Hell Creek Formation. The main groups of ornithischians are ankylosaurians, ornithopods, ceratopsians, and pachycephalosaurians.
Three ankylosaurians are known: Ankylosaurus, Denversaurus, and possibly a species of Edmontonia or an undescribed genus.
Multiple genera of ceratopsians are known from the formation other than Triceratops, the leptoceratopsid Leptoceratops, and the chasmosaurine ceratopsids Torosaurus, Nedoceratops and Tatankaceratops.
Ornithopods are common in the Hell Creek Formation, and are known from several species of the ornithopod Thescelosaurus and the hadrosaurid  Edmontosaurus.
Several pachycephalosaurians have been found in the Hell Creek Formation and in similar formations. Among them are the derived pachycephalosaurids Stygimoloch, Dracorex, Pachycephalosaurus, Sphaerotholus, and an undescribed specimen from North Dakota. The first two might be junior synonyms of Pachycephalosaurus.

Mammals are plentiful in the Hell Creek Formation. Groups represented include multituberculates, metatherians, and eutherians:
The multituberculates represented include Paracimexomys; the cimolomyids Paressonodon, Meniscoessus, Essonodon, Cimolomys, Cimolodon, and Cimexomys; and the neoplagiaulacids Mesodma, and Neoplagiaulax.
The metatherians are represented by the alphadontids Alphadon, Protalphodon, and Turgidodon; the pediomyids Pediomys, Protolambda, and Leptalestes; the stagodontid Didelphodon; the deltatheridiid Nanocuris; the herpetotheriid Nortedelphys; and the glasbiid Glasbius.
A few eutherians are known, being represented by Alostera; Protungulatum; the cimolestids Cimolestes and Batodon; the gypsonictopsid Gypsonictops; and the possible nyctitheriid Paranyctoides.

Cultural significance

Triceratops is the opisyal state fossil of South Dakota (US), and the official state dinosaur of Wyoming (US).
In 1942, Charles R. Knight painted a mural incorporating a confrontation between a Tyrannosaurus and a Triceratops in the Field Museum of Natural History for the National Geographic Society, establishing them as enemies in the popular imagination. Paleontologist Bob Bakker said of the imagined rivalry between Tyrannosaurus and Triceratops, "No matchup between predator and prey has ever been more dramatic. It's somehow fitting that those two massive antagonists lived out their co-evolutionary belligerence through the last days of the last epoch of the Age of Dinosaurs."

References

External links

 Triceratops at The Dinosaur Picture Database
 LiveScience: Facts about Triceratops at LiveScience.com
 
 Dinosaur Mailing List post on Triceratops stance
 Smithsonian Exhibit
 Triceratops in the Dino Directory
 Triceratops (short summary and good color illustration)
 Triceratops For Kids (a fact sheet about the Triceratops with activities for kids)
 Triceratops, BBC Dinosaurs
  Triceratops – Liste de Dinosauria et Extinction

Chasmosaurines
Fossil taxa described in 1889
Hell Creek fauna
Late Cretaceous dinosaurs of North America
Maastrichtian life
Symbols of South Dakota
Symbols of Wyoming
Taxa named by Othniel Charles Marsh
Lance fauna
Scollard fauna
Paleontology in Colorado
Paleontology in Wyoming
Paleontology in South Dakota
Paleontology in Alberta
Paleontology in Saskatchewan
Laramie Formation
Maastrichtian genus first appearances
Maastrichtian genus extinctions
Ornithischian genera